The  is a rapid transit electric multiple unit (EMU) train type formerly operated by the Transportation Bureau City of Nagoya on the Nagoya Subway Higashiyama Line in Japan from July 1980 until August 2015. Following their withdrawal in Japan, five sets were shipped to Argentina in 2015 for use on Line C of the Buenos Aires Underground.

Formation
The trains were formed as six-car sets, as follows.

One car was designated as a "women-only car" during the morning and evening peak periods on weekdays as a measure to reduce sexual assault during crowded times.

History
The first trains entered service on 1 July 1980. These were the first air-conditioned trains to be used on the Higashiyama Line. A total of 23 sets were built between 1980 and 1990.

Withdrawal and resale

The last remaining 5000 series train in service, set 5114, was withdrawn from the Higashiyama Line following a special final run on 30 August 2015.

In 2015, five 5000 series units (30 vehicles) were shipped to Argentina to be used on Line C of the Buenos Aires Underground. These sets were modified with pantographs to operate from a 1,500 V overhead supply instead of the original 600 V third rail.

References

External links

 Nagoya Transportation Bureau's technical details about the 5000 series 

Electric multiple units of Japan
5000 series
Train-related introductions in 1980
Rolling stock of the Buenos Aires Underground
600 V DC multiple units
1500 V DC multiple units of Japan